Vladimir Andreyevich Chernov (born 15 January 1991) is a former Russian footballer.

Career
Cheremisin made his professional debut for Rubin Kazan on 13 July 2010 in the Russian Cup game against FC Volgar-Gazprom Astrakhan.

External links

Player page on the official FC Rubin Kazan website

1991 births
Footballers from Kazan
Living people
Russian footballers
Association football midfielders
FC Rubin Kazan players
FC Gornyak Uchaly players